Sumak is a village in the Pertek District, Tunceli Province, Turkey. The village is populated by Kurds of the Kurêşan tribe and had a population of 79 in 2021.

References 

Kurdish settlements in Tunceli Province
Villages in Pertek District